The 1981-82 Penn State Nittany Lions men's basketball team represented the Pennsylvania State University during the 1981-82 NCAA Division I men's basketball season. The team was led by 4th-year head coach Dick Harter, and played their home games at Rec Hall in University Park, Pennsylvania.

Schedule

Source

References

Penn State Nittany Lions basketball seasons
Penn State
1981 in sports in Pennsylvania
1982 in sports in Pennsylvania